"A Real Fine Place to Start" is a song written by Radney Foster and George Ducas and recorded by American country music artist Sara Evans. It was released in May 2005 as the first single from Evans' 2005 album Real Fine Place.  The song became Evans' fourth number one hit on the US Billboard Hot Country Songs chart in September 2005, holding that position for two weeks. This would also be her last number one single until "A Little Bit Stronger" reached number one in May 2011. On June 15, 2006, the song was certified Gold by the RIAA.

Content
"A Real Fine Place to Start" is an up-tempo contemporary country song, with prominent electric guitar and steel guitar fills. The song's narrator tells about being in love and getting to know a person from the beginning, describing this as "a real fine place to start."

The song was originally recorded by co-writer Radney Foster on his 2002 album, Another Way to Go.

Music video

The music video is mainly set in a desert with Evans singing the song in various places around the desert. In the beginning of the video a motorcycle is shown driving along a road in the middle in the desert with a couple in it. The couple then stops on the roadside and the video then shows the two holding hands and sitting on rocks in the desert. The couple exemplifies what the song is talking about. The video regularly shifts between Evans and the couple in the music video. While the video isn't showing the couple, it is showing Evans singing in various places in the desert, including desert rocks and by a bonfire. Towards the middle of the song, the video shows Evans performing with a band at night. The video also shows Evans playing her rhythmic guitar for a brief period of time. It was directed by Peter Zavadil, and filmed at Grand Canyon National Park in Flagstaff, AZ.

The music video reached number 1 on CMT's Top Twenty Countdown for the week of October 6, 2005.

Chart performance
"A Real Fine Place to Start" spent approximately four months on the charts, becoming her fourth Number One hit of her career, on the U.S. Billboard Hot Country Songs chart in September 2005. It stayed at number one on the country charts for two weeks and was one of the biggest hits of the summer and of the year. The song also peaked at number 38 on the U.S. Billboard Hot 100, becoming Evans' fifth Top 40 hit on the Hot 100, and Evans' first single to chart on the U.S. Billboard Pop 100.

Year-end charts

Certifications

References

2005 singles
Sara Evans songs
Radney Foster songs
Songs written by Radney Foster
Songs written by George Ducas (singer)
RCA Records Nashville singles
Music videos directed by Peter Zavadil
Song recordings produced by Mark Bright (record producer)
2005 songs